Zsolt Bücs (born 8 September 1963 in Mátészalka, Hungary) is a football coach and former footballer midfielder from Hungary.

Home United
Known for his role as a playmaker and his eye for a pass, Bucs drove the S.League club to a mid-table finish in 1998. Securing the title with the Protectors a year later, the Hungarian's season was further embellished by earning the 1999 S.League Player of the Year Award. However, he was not congruent with his management in terms of his wage package, leaving the club for this reason by the 2000 S.League. Returning as coach to his former club in 2006, Bücs added Singaporean fullback Zahid Ahmad and Malian defender Bah Mamadou to his lineup, as well as midfielders Rosman Sulaiman, Firdaus Salleh and Hungarian Gabor Boer, who failed to make an impact there. Reportedly, the midfielder was one of the highest-paid S.League players, earning 21,500 Singaporean dollars a month.

References

External links
 Bucs is bubbling- The New Paper (only accessible from multimedia stations at NLB Libraries)

Expatriate footballers in Germany
Hungarian footballers
1963 births
Hungary international footballers
Hungarian expatriate footballers
Hungarian expatriate sportspeople in Germany
Association football midfielders
Singapore Premier League players
Sri Pahang FC players
Selangor FA players
Expatriate footballers in Singapore
Home United FC players
Expatriate footballers in Malaysia
Expatriate footballers in Israel
Shimshon Tel Aviv F.C. players
Living people
People from Mátészalka
Sportspeople from Szabolcs-Szatmár-Bereg County
Volán FC players